Jewish entertainers by country:

Austria
Britain
Canada
France
Germany
Hungary
Israel
Poland
Russia
United States

For others see
Jewish people from Scandinavia and the Baltics
Jewish people from Eastern Europe
Jewish people from Western Europe
Jewish people from Latin America

Performing arts by country